SS United States was a merchant steamship launched in 1864 and lost off Cape Romain, South Carolina, in 1881. She was the most expensive steamer built by the American shipbuilding firm of S. Gildersleeve & Son, which built 120 vessels. The vessel was named for her country and sported the United States' national symbol, an American eagle, as her figurehead. 

She ran aground on Cape Romain on April 3, 1881.

In June 2013, E. Lee Spence announced that United Statess wreck site had been located.

Construction
United States, official number 25082, signal letters HSCM, home ported at Boston, was built in 1864 at the S. Gildersleeve & Son shipyard in Portland, Connecticut.

Description
A screw steamer, United States was brigantine rigged (square rigged on the foremast and fore-and-aft rigged on the mainmast). She had an iron-strapped wood hull with three decks, a round stern, and deck saloons. The ship was built of white oak and cedar with fastenings were copper alloy and iron, and had a copper bottom (probably Muntz Metal, 60% copper and 40% zinc, with a trace of iron). She was built under inspection and classed A-1 for insurance purposes. The engine was a vertical direct action steam engine with two  cylinders with a 40-inch piston stroke.

Ownership
Shortly after her launch, her captain was shown as Gurdon Gates and her owners as Wakemann, Dimon & Company and S. Gildersleeve & Sons.

Her homeport in 1872 was New York City and at that time she was captained by G.H. Smith and owned by Merchant Steamship Company.

By 1880, her home port was Boston, Massachusetts, where she was owned by Alfred A. Nickerson and Frederic W. Nickerson.

Loss
On 6 April 1881, the Boston Daily Globe carried the headline "Wreck of the Well-Known Steamer of the Boston and Savannah Line Off Cape Romain" and reported:

Despite the hopes expressed above, United States was not able to be pulled off and the next day the Charleston News and Courier carried the following article titled "The Stranded Steamship.": 

Her permanent enrollment, which was issued at Boston on May 4, 1880, and surrendered at Boston on May 5, 1881, carries the note: "Vessel wrecked April 3, 1881, near Charleston, S.C.", while other official government records show her as "Lost June 30, 1881," which may have been the day of her legal abandonment by her owners.

At the time of her loss, United States was described as valued at about $60,000 and her cargo as worth about $25,000.

Distribution of cargo
United States had three decks. Cargo could have been stored on any of them. The ship's hold, where the majority of a ship's cargo was stored, was not normally considered a deck. Contemporary newspaper accounts specifically mention her "between decks cargo." A "between deck" or "tweendeck" is any deck between the main deck and the ship's hold. "Tweendeck space" is the space between any two continuous decks. The mention of a between decks cargo suggests that her hold was filled to capacity, as, for weight and balance considerations, it would have been loaded first.

Cargo such as bales, bags, or drums can be stacked in the tweendeck space, atop the tweendeck.

Beneath the lowest deck is the hold space, used for general cargo. General cargo was packaged and crated items like jewelry, bottled medicines, wine, liquor, china, guns, mantle clocks, furniture, machinery, footwear, garments, and other merchandise.

Contemporary salvage
Although aground, it was initially thought United States could be saved. By the time it was realized that she couldn't be saved, she had  of water in her and was "fast going to pieces." The easily accessible "between deck" cargo, was saved in good condition.

There is no record that any of the merchandise in her cargo hold, which was below water, was salvaged.

References

1864 ships
Ships built in Portland, Connecticut
Maritime incidents in April 1881
Shipwrecks in the Atlantic Ocean
Shipwrecks of the Carolina coast